USS Dorado (SS-248), a Gato-class submarine, was the first submarine of the United States Navy to be named for the dorado.

Construction and commissioning
Dorado′s keel was laid down on 27 August 1942 by the Electric Boat Company of Groton, Connecticut. She was launched on 23 May 1943, sponsored by Mrs. Ezra G. Allen, wife of Rear Admiral Ezra G. Allen, Budget Officer of the United States Department of the Navy, and commissioned on 28 August 1943.

Service history

Dorados sea trials proved the readiness of the crew, and she sailed from New London, Connecticut, on 6 October 1943 for the Panama Canal Zone. She did not arrive.

However, the crew of a PBM Mariner of Patrol Squadron 210 out of Guantánamo Bay, Cuba, assigned to provide air coverage on the evening of 12 October had received an incorrect description of the restriction area,  out of place.

At 2049 local time, under a moon-lit but stormy sky, that plane attacked an unidentified submarine that it believed was outside the restriction area with three Mark-47 depth charges and a  Mark-4 Mod-4 demolition bomb. About two hours later, the plane sighted a second submarine with which it attempted to exchange recognition signals. This second submarine fired upon the plane.

A convoy scheduled to pass through the restricted area surrounding Dorado on the evening of 12 October reported no contact.

Air searches were begun immediately after 14 October, her scheduled date of arrival. Widely scattered oil slicks with occasional debris were found. Subsequently, the Board of Investigation held in Guantánamo Bay, and the more formal Naval Board of Inquiry held at the Washington Navy Yard, found that the "widely scattered oil slicks" were actually oleous in nature and not bunker oil or fuel - most probably rotting vegetation like seaweed. All of the "occasional debris" was determined not to have come from Dorado.

At both the Board of Investigation and the Court of Inquiry, the aircrew testified that they were certain that both submarines they had attacked were U-boats. Despite the circumstantial evidence, there are reasons to doubt that Dorado was sunk by the Mariner. Because the crew knew that Dorado was operating in the area, they carefully observed their two targets before attacking.  Prior to the first attack, the four crewmen of the aircraft observed the surfaced submarine for 12 minutes, noting:

 it was heading almost 90 degrees off from Dorado’s base course
 it had no guns on the fore deck where Dorado carried a five-inch (127 mm) gun
 it had an entirely grooved deck where Dorados deck was grooved only near the conning tower
 it had a "knob-like" object on the front of the conning tower, almost certainly the Metox radar detector installed on Type IX U-boats

Post-war examination of Kriegsmarine records indicate that the submarine first attacked by the Mariner may have been , though that boat's logs do not record the attack. It is possible that the attack went unnoticed by the boat; of the three depth charges and one 100-pound bomb that were dropped, one depth charge was a confirmed dud, one was dropped too low to arm, and neither the third depth charge nor the bomb were seen to explode. After the attack, the Mariner searched the area for 20 minutes, but saw no explosions, bubbles, or debris.

The second submarine, attacked by the Mariner two hours later, was certainly U-214; her log book, captured after World War II, describes firing at the aircraft.

On 8 October, five miles off Colón, U-214 laid a minefield of 15 mines. One of these may have sunk the USS Dorado on or about 14 October.

Legacy
A memorial to Dorado has been constructed in the Veterans Memorial Park in Wichita, Kansas on the Arkansas River.

A 614-page book entitled "USS DORADO (SS-248): On Eternal Patrol" was published by Douglas E. Campbell in November 2011.

Before she was lost, the American painter Thomas Hart Benton sailed aboard Dorado on its shakedown cruise, using that experience as the basis for his paintings Score Another for the Subs, In Slumber Deep, and The Claustrophobic Confines.

Dorado was one of only two U.S. Navy submarines lost in the Atlantic Ocean during World War II.  The other was the USS R-12 which sank during a training dive near Key West, Florida.

References

External links
The Syneca Research Group's discussion of Dorado is published at http://www.ussdorado.com
On Eternal Patrol: USS Dorado
NavSource Online: Submarine Photo Archive

Gato-class submarines
World War II submarines of the United States
Lost submarines of the United States
World War II shipwrecks in the Atlantic Ocean
Ships built in Groton, Connecticut
1943 ships
Maritime incidents in October 1943
Friendly fire incidents of World War II